Nik Ahmad Kamil bin Nik Mahmud (7 July 1909 – 20 December 1977) was a Malaysian politician who played an active role during the country's road to independence. A prominent member of the United Malays National Organisation (UMNO) in the state of Kelantan, he served as the fourth Speaker of the Dewan Rakyat, the lower house of the Malaysian Parliament.

Nik Ahmad Kamil was a lawyer and a member of the Bar. His daughter, Nik Mariah was also a lawyer and member of the Bar.

Early life and career
Nik Ahmad Kamil was born in Kota Bharu in 1909. His father, Nik Mahmud Nik Ismail was the Menteri Besar of Kelantan. He was educated at Madrasah Muhammadiah, Kota Bharu and Malay College Kuala Kangsar. After studying Arts at the University of Bristol, he obtained his Bachelor of Laws from Lincoln's Inn in 1930. He was called to the Bar that year.

He joined the Kelantan civil service under the British colonial administration in 1930 and served as State Secretary from 1934 to 1938, succeeding his uncle. In 1938, he was appointed Deputy Menteri Besar under his father. He succeeded his father as Menteri Besar in 1942 and held the post throughout the Japanese occupation.

Political career
From 1946 to 1948, during the Malayan Union period, Nik Ahmad Kamil served as Deputy Resident Commissioner in Kelantan under the new system of government. However, he became a staunch opponent of the Malayan Union and led the Persatuan Melayu Kelantan (Kelantan Malay Association, PKM) in protesting the new system, which he felt infringed upon the rights of the Malays and their rulers. He represented PKM at the first Pan-Malayan Malay Congress in Johor Bahru in 1946 which saw the founding of the United Malays National Organisation (UMNO). He was an active member of UMNO, serving on its executive committee. When the Malayan Union was finally dissolved in 1948, Nik Ahmad Kamil continued as Menteri Besar of Kelantan under the new Federation of Malaya until 1953.

Parti Negara
Nik Ahmad Kamil was a close supporter of UMNO founder Onn Jaafar. He was selected by Onn to join a working committee in charge of drafting a charter for the newly formed UMNO. He followed Onn's exit from UMNO in 1951 and joined the Independence of Malaya Party and Parti Negara, two parties formed by Onn in opposition to UMNO and the Alliance Party. He was chosen to serve under the Member System from 1953 to 1956, and held the Lands, Mines and Communications portfolio and later the Local Government, Housing and Town Development portfolio.

Back in UMNO
In the first ever federal elections in 1955, Nik Ahmad Kamil contested a seat as a Parti Negara candidate. He lost, and Parti Negara was swept aside by the Alliance Party led by Tunku Abdul Rahman. Realizing that Parti Negara had failed to gain relevance among the people of Malaya, he left to rejoin UMNO. He served under the new Alliance government as Commissioner of Trade to Australia from 1956 to 1957.

Diplomacy
Nik Ahmad Kamil joined the 1956 Merdeka Delegation led by the Tunku to London as one of four representatives of the Malay rulers. Following the independence of Malaya on 31 August 1957, he was appointed the first High Commissioner to the United Kingdom and served until 1958. He remained in the diplomatic circles and served as both Permanent Representative to the United Nations as well as Ambassador to the United States from 1959 to 1962.

Return to active politics
Nik Ahmad Kamil returned to contest the 1964 general election and won the Kota Bharu Hilir parliamentary seat in Kelantan. However, UMNO still lost out to the Pan-Malaysian Islamic Party (PAS) in Kelantan. In the next election in 1969, he won the Ulu Kelantan seat as PAS retained control of the state.

He served as a member of the UMNO supreme council and later became its permanent chairman. In 1971, he was elected Deputy Speaker of the Dewan Rakyat. In 1974, he succeeded C.M. Yusuf as Speaker of the Dewan Rakyat, a position he held until his death.

Death
Nik Ahmad Kamil suffered a heart attack while carrying out his duties in the Parliament building on 19 December 1977. He died the following morning.

Honours

Honours of Malaysia
  :
  Commander of the Order of the Defender of the Realm (PMN) – Tan Sri (1958)
 :
  Recipient of the Malaysian Commemorative Medal (Gold) (PPM) (1965)
  :
  Recipient of the Royal Family Order or Star of Yunus (DK)
  Knight Grand Commander of the Order of the Crown of Kelantan or Al-Muhammadi Star (SPMK)
  Knight Grand Commander of the Order of the Life of the Crown of Kelantan or Al-Ismaili Star (SJMK)
  Recipient of the Order of the Most Distinguished and Most Valiant Warrior (PYGP)

References

|-

Chief Ministers of Kelantan
Speakers of the Dewan Rakyat
United Malays National Organisation politicians
1909 births
1977 deaths
Ambassadors of Malaysia to the United States
Malaysian expatriates in the United States
Malaysian people of Malay descent
Malaysian Muslims
Members of the Dewan Rakyat
Kelantan state executive councillors
Commanders of the Order of the Defender of the Realm
High Commissioners of Malaysia to the United Kingdom
High Commissioners of Malaysia to Australia